Arval J. Roberson (1923–2007) was a United States Air Force officer who was a fighter ace during World War II with the 362nd Fighter Squadron and the last commander of Otis Air Force Base.

References

External links
Information on Roberson's plane

1923 births
2007 deaths
Aces
United States Air Force officers
American military personnel of World War II